The Washington Times is an American conservative daily newspaper published in Washington, D.C., that covers general interest topics with a particular emphasis on national politics. Its broadsheet daily edition is distributed throughout the District of Columbia and in parts of Maryland and Virginia. A weekly tabloid edition aimed at a national audience is also published. The Washington Times was one of the first American broadsheets to publish its front page in full color.

The Washington Times was founded on May 17, 1982, by Unification movement leader Sun Myung Moon and owned until 2010 by News World Communications, an international media conglomerate founded by Moon. It is currently owned by Operations Holdings, which is a part of the Unification movement.

Throughout its history, The Washington Times has been known for its conservative political stance, supporting the policies of Republican presidents Ronald Reagan, George H. W. Bush, George W. Bush, and Donald Trump. Reagan was a daily reader of The Washington Times. It has published many widely shared columns which reject the scientific consensus on multiple environmental issues. It has drawn controversy by publishing racist content, including conspiracy theories about U.S. President Barack Obama and by supporting neo-Confederate historical revisionism.

History

Beginnings
The Washington Times was founded in 1982 by News World Communications, an international media conglomerate associated with the Unification movement which also owns newspapers in South Korea, Japan, and South America, as well as the news agency United Press International (UPI). Bo Hi Pak, the chief aide of Unification movement founder and leader Sun Myung Moon, was the founding president and the founding chairman of the board. Moon asked Richard L. Rubenstein, a rabbi and college professor who had written on the Holocaust, to serve on the board of directors. The Washington Times first editor and publisher was James R. Whelan.

At the time of founding of The Washington Times, Washington had only one major newspaper, The Washington Post. Massimo Introvigne, in his 2000 book The Unification Church, said that the Post had been "the most anti-Unificationist paper in the United States." In 2002, at an event held to celebrate the Times 20th anniversary, Moon said: "The Washington Times is responsible to let the American people know about God" and "The Washington Times will become the instrument in spreading the truth about God to the world."

The Washington Times was founded the year after The Washington Star, the previous "second paper" of D.C., went out of business. A large percentage of the staff came from the Star. When it launched, it was unusual among American broadsheets in publishing a full color front page, along with full color front pages in all its sections and color elements throughout. It also used ink that it advertised as being less likely to come off on the reader's hands than the type used by the Post. At its start, it had 125 reporters, 25 percent of whom were members of the Unification Church of the United States.

The Washington Times reporters visited imprisoned South African civil rights activist Nelson Mandela during the 1980s. Mandela wrote of them in his autobiography Long Walk to Freedom: "They seemed less intent on finding out my views than on proving that I was a Communist and a terrorist. All of their questions were slanted in that direction, and when I reiterated that I was neither a Communist nor a terrorist, they attempted to show that I was not a Christian either by asserting that the Reverend Martin Luther King never resorted to violence."

After a brief editorship under Smith Hempstone, Arnaud de Borchgrave (formerly of UPI and Newsweek) was executive editor from 1985 to 1991. Borchgrave was credited for encouraging energetic reporting by staff but was known to make unorthodox journalistic decisions. During his tenure, The Washington Times mounted a fundraising drive for Contra rebels in Nicaragua and offered rewards for information leading to the arrest of Nazi war criminals.

In 1985 News World started publishing a weekly news magazine called Insight on the News (also called just Insight) as a companion to The Washington Times.  Insights reporting sometimes resulted in journalistic controversy.

U.S. President Ronald Reagan read The Washington Times every day during his presidency. In 1997, he said: "The American people know the truth. You, my friends at The Washington Times, have told it to them. It wasn't always the popular thing to do. But you were a loud and powerful voice. Like me, you arrived in Washington at the beginning of the most momentous decade of the century. Together, we rolled up our sleeves and got to work. And—oh, yes—we won the Cold War."

Wesley Pruden editorship 1992–2008
Wesley "Wes" Pruden, previously a correspondent and then a managing editor, was named executive editor in 1991. During his editorship, the paper took a strongly conservative and nativist stance.

In 1992, North Korean leader Kim Il Sung gave his first and only interview with the Western news media to The Washington Times reporter Josette Sheeran, who later became executive director of the United Nations World Food Programme. At the time, The Washington Times had one-eighth the circulation of the Post (100,000 compared to 800,000) and two-thirds of its subscribers subscribed to both papers. In 1994, it introduced a weekly "national edition" which was published in a tabloid format and distributed nationwide.

U.S. President George H. W. Bush encouraged the political influence of The Washington Times and other Unification movement activism in support of American foreign policy. In 1997, the Washington Report on Middle East Affairs, which is critical of U.S. and Israeli policies, praised The Washington Times and its sister publication, The Middle East Times, for what it called their objective and informative coverage of Islam and the Middle East, while criticizing their generally pro-Israel editorial policy. The Report suggested that these newspapers, being owned by religious institutions, were less influenced by pro-Israel pressure groups in the U.S.

In 2004, Washington Post columnist David Ignatius reported that Chung Hwan Kwak, an important leader in the Unification movement, wanted The Washington Times to "support international organizations such as the United Nations and to campaign for world peace and interfaith understanding." This, Ignatius wrote, created difficulties for Pruden and some of the Times columnists. Ignatius also mentioned the Unification movement's reconciliatory attitude towards North Korea, which at the time included joint business ventures, and Kwak's advocacy for greater understanding between the U.S. and the Islamic world as issues of contention. Ignatius predicted that conservatives in Congress and the George W. Bush administration would support Pruden's position over Kwak's.

In 2006, Moon's son Hyun Jin Moon, president and CEO of News World Communications, dismissed managing editor Francis "Fran" Coombs because of accusations of racist editorializing. Coombs had made some racist and sexist comments, for which he was sued by other employees of The Washington Times.

John Solomon editorship 2008–2015

In January 2008, Pruden retired, and John F. Solomon began as executive editor. Solomon had previously worked for the Associated Press and had most recently been head of investigative reporting and mixed media development at the Post. Within a month, The Washington Times changed some of its style guide to conform more to what was becoming mainstream media usage. It announced that it would no longer use words like "illegal aliens" and "homosexual" and in most cases opt for "more neutral terminology" like "illegal immigrants" and "gay", respectively. It also decided to stop using "Hillary" when referring to Senator Hillary Clinton, and the word "marriage" in the expression "gay marriage" would no longer appear in quotes in the newspaper. These changes in policy drew criticism from some conservatives. Prospect magazine attributed the Times apparent political moderation to differences of opinion over the UN and North Korea, and said: "The Republican right may be losing its most devoted media ally."

In July 2010, the Unification Church issued a letter protesting the direction The Washington Times was taking and urging closer ties with it. In August 2010, a deal was made to sell it to a group more closely related to the movement. Editor-in-chief Sam Dealey said that this was a welcome development among the Times staff. In November 2010, Moon and a group of former editors purchased The Washington Times from News World Communications for $1. This ended a conflict within the Moon family that had been threatening to shut down the paper completely. In June 2011, Ed Kelley, formerly of The Oklahoman, was hired as editor overseeing both news and opinion content.

In 2012, Douglas D. M. Joo stepped down as senior executive, president, and chairman. Times president Tom McDevitt took his place as chairman, and Larry Beasley was hired as the company's new president and chief executive officer.

In 2013, The Washington Times partnered with Herring Networks to create a new conservative cable news channel, One America News (OAN), which began broadcasting in mid‑2013.

In 2013, The Washington Times hired David Keene, the former president of the National Rifle Association and American Conservative Union chairman, to serve as its opinion editor. Around the same time, Solomon returned as editor and also served as vice president of content and business development. Solomon's tenure was marked by a focus on profitability. He left for Circa News in December 2015.

Donald Trump campaign and presidency
Opinion editor Charles Hurt was one of Donald Trump's earliest supporters in Washington. In 2018, he included Trump with Ronald Reagan, Martin Luther King Jr., Margaret Thatcher, and Pope John Paul II as "great champions of freedom." In 2016 The Washington Times did not endorse a presidential candidate, but endorsed Trump for reelection in 2020.

Finances
In 1991, Moon said he had spent between $900 million and $1 billion on The Washington Times. By 2002, Moon had spent between $1.7 billion and $2 billion according to different estimates. In November 2009, The New York Times reported that The Washington Times would no longer be receiving funds from the Unification movement and might have to cease publication or become an online publication only. Later that year, it fired 40 percent of its 370 employees and stopped its subscription service, instead distributing the paper free in some areas of Washington, including branches of the government. A subscription website owned by the paper, theconservatives.com, continued, as did the Times three-hour radio program, America's Morning News. The paper announced that it would cease publication of its Sunday edition, along with other changes, partly in order to end its reliance on subsidies from the Unification movement. On December 31, 2009, The Washington Times announced that it would no longer be a full-service newspaper, eliminating its metropolitan-news and sports sections. In March 2011, it announced that some former staffers would be rehired and that the paper would bring back its sports, metro, and life sections. It had its first profitable month in September 2015, ending the streak of losses in the paper's first 33 years. During the 2020 COVID-19 pandemic, The Washington Times received between $1 million and $2 million in federally backed small business loans from Citibank as part of the Paycheck Protection Program, which it said would help to retain 91 employees.

Political stance
The Washington Times holds a conservative political stance. In 1995, the Columbia Journalism Review wrote that it "is like no major city daily in America in the way that it wears its political heart on its sleeve. No major paper in America would dare be so partisan." In 2002, The Washington Post reported that it "was established by Moon to combat communism and be a conservative alternative to what he perceived as the liberal leanings of The Washington Post. Since then, the paper has fought to prove its editorial independence, trying to demonstrate that it is neither a "Moonie paper" nor a booster of the political right but rather a fair and balanced reporter of the news." In 2007, Mother Jones reported that The Washington Times had become "essential reading for political news junkies" soon after its founding, and described it as a "conservative newspaper with close ties to every Republican administration since Reagan."

In a Harper's Magazine essay in 2008, American historian Thomas Frank linked The Washington Times to the modern American conservative movement, saying: "There is even a daily newspaper—The Washington Times—published strictly for the movement's benefit, a propaganda sheet whose distortions are so obvious and so alien that it puts one in mind of those official party organs one encounters when traveling in authoritarian countries." The New York Times noted in 2009 that it had been "a crucial training ground for many rising conservative journalists and a must-read for those in the movement. A veritable who's who of conservatives—Tony Blankley, Frank J. Gaffney Jr., Larry Kudlow, John Podhoretz and Tony Snow—has churned out copy for its pages." The Columbia Journalism Review noted that reporters for The Washington Times had used it as a springboard to other mainstream news outlets.

In 2002, Post veteran Ben Bradlee said: "I see them get some local stories that I think the Post doesn't have and should have had." In January 2011, conservative commentator Paul Weyrich said: "The Washington Post became very arrogant and they just decided that they would determine what was news and what wasn't news and they wouldn't cover a lot of things that went on. And The Washington Times has forced the Post to cover a lot of things that they wouldn't cover if the Times wasn't in existence."

Awards 
Alexander Hunter, designer and editorial illustrator for The Washington Times, has won the 2019 Sigma Delta Chi Award for excellence in journalism from the Society of Professional Journalists.

Thom Loverro, lead sports columnist for The Washington Times, won a Sigma Delta Chi Award for Sports Column Writing in 2014.

In 2013, The Washington Times won two Sigma Delta Chi Awards for excellence in journalism from the Society of Professional Journalists for Deadline Reporting (Daily Circulation of 1–50,000) and Investigative Reporting (Daily Circulation 1–50,000).

Guy Taylor and Dan Boylan, reporters for The Washington Times, won an Honorable Mention for the 31st annual Gerald R. Ford Journalism Prize for Distinguished Reporting on the Presidency.

The Washington Times Advertising department won first and third place in the 2019 VPA News and Advertising contest  in the Special Sections (standalone section non-slick cover) category. Outstanding design and creative artwork for the Qatar and Rolling Thunder Special Section covers landed the department the award.

Controversies

General controversies 
Some former employees, including Whelan, have insisted that The Washington Times was always under Moon's control. Whelan, whose contract guaranteed editorial autonomy, left the paper in 1984 when the owners refused to renew his contract. Three years later, editorial page editor William P. Cheshire and four of his staff resigned, charging that, at the explicit direction of Sang Kook Han, a top official of the Unification movement, then-executive editor Arnaud de Borchgrave had stifled editorial criticism of political repression in South Korea under President Chun Doo-hwan. In 1982, The Washington Times refused to publish film critic Scott Sublett's negative review of the movie Inchon, which was also sponsored by the Unification movement.

In 1988, The Washington Times published a misleading story suggesting that Democratic presidential candidate Michael Dukakis had sought psychiatric help, and included a quote from Dukakis' sister-in-law saying "it is possible" he visited a psychiatrist. However, The Washington Times misleadingly clipped the full quote by the sister-in-law, which was: "It's possible, but I doubt it." Reporter Peggy Weyrich quit in 1991 after one of her articles about Anita Hill's testimony in the Clarence Thomas Supreme Court nominee hearings was rewritten to depict Hill as a "fantasizer."

During the presidency of Bill Clinton The Washington Times reporting on his alleged sex scandals was often picked up by other, more respected, news media which contributed to enhanced public awareness of the topic,  and eventually to Clinton's impeachment.  In 1999 the Senate voted to acquit Clinton, allowing him to complete his second term as president.

In a 1997 column in The Washington Times, Frank Gaffney falsely alleged that a seismic incident in Russia was a nuclear detonation at that nation's Novaya Zemlya test site, which would have meant that Russia had violated the Comprehensive Test Ban Treaty (CTB). Subsequent scientific analysis of the Novaya Zemlya event showed that it was a routine earthquake. Reporting on the allegation, the Bulletin of the Atomic Scientists observed that following its publication: "fax machines around Washington, D.C. and across the country poured out pages detailing Russian duplicity. They came from Frank Gaffney." The Bulletin also noted that during the first four months of 1997, Gaffney had "issued more than 25 screeds" against the CTB.

In 2002, The Washington Times published a story accusing the National Educational Association (NEA), the largest teachers' union in the United States, of teaching students that the policies of the U.S. government were partly responsible for the 2001 terrorist attacks on the World Trade Center. The NEA responded to the story by denying all of its accusations. Brendan Nyhan, later a  political science professor at the University of Michigan, wrote that The Washington Times story was a "lie" and a "myth".

In 2018, The Washington Times published a commentary piece by retired U.S. Navy admiral James A. Lyons which promoted conspiracy theories about the murder of Seth Rich. Lyon wrote that it was "well known in intelligence circles that Seth Rich and his brother, Aaron Rich, downloaded the DNC emails and was paid by WikiLeaks for that information." The piece cited no evidence for the assertion. Aaron Rich filed a lawsuit against The Washington Times, saying that it acted with "reckless disregard for the truth" and that it did not retract or remove the piece after "receiving notice of the falsity of the statements about Aaron after the publication". Rich and The Washington Times settled their lawsuit, and the paper issued an "unusually robust" retraction.

On January 6, 2021, after violent pro-Trump rioters attacked the United States Capitol, The Washington Times published a false story quoting an unidentified retired military officer claiming that the facial recognition system company XRVision had used its technology and identified two members of Antifa amid the mob. XRVision quickly denied this, sending a cease and desist to The Washington Times, and issued a statement saying that its technology had actually identified two Neo-Nazis and a believer in the QAnon conspiracy theory and that it had not done any detection work for a retired military officer authorized to share that information. On January 7, the article was removed from the website and replaced with a corrected version. Before the correction, Representative Matt Gaetz cited the original story as proof that Antifa were partially responsible for the attack in the floor debate of the 2021 United States Electoral College vote count, and it was widely shared on social media.

The Washington Times has at least twice published articles, one written by the ambassador of Turkey to the US and one by an attorney and lobbyist for the Turkish government, that deny the Armenian genocide.

Science coverage

Climate change denial 
The Washington Times is known for promoting climate change denial. Michael E. Mann, director of the Earth System Science Center at Pennsylvania State University, characterizes the Times as a prominent outlet that propagates "climate change disinformation." Naomi Oreskes, Professor of the History of Science at Harvard University, and Erik M. Conway, historian of science at NASA's Jet Propulsion Laboratory at the California Institute of Technology, wrote in their 2010 book Merchants of Doubt that the Times has given the public a false sense that the science of anthropogenic climate change was in dispute by giving disproportionate coverage of fringe viewpoints and by preventing scientists from rebutting coverage in the Times. The Washington Times reprinted a column by Steve Milloy criticizing research of climate change in the Arctic without disclosing Milloy's financial ties to the fossil fuel industry.

During the Climatic Research Unit email controversy (also known as "Climategate") in 2009 in the lead-up to the UN Climate Change Conference in Copenhagen, the Times wrote in an editorial: "these revelations of fudged science should have a cooling effect on global-warming hysteria and the panicked policies that are being pushed forward to address the unproven theory." Eight committees investigated the controversy and found no evidence of fraud or scientific misconduct. In 2010, the Times published an article claiming that February 2010 snow storms "Undermin[e] The Case For Global Warming One Flake At A Time". A 2014 Times editorial mocked the "global warming scam" and asserted: "The planetary thermometer hasn’t budged in 15 years. Wildfires, tornadoes, hurricanes and other ‘extreme’ weather events are at normal or below-normal levels. Pacific islands aren't submerged. There's so much ice the polar bears are celebrating." The Times cited a blog post in support of these claims; PolitiFact fact-checked the claims in the blog post and concluded it was "pants-on-fire" false. The Times later said that a NASA scientist claimed that global warming was on a "hiatus" and that NASA had found evidence of global cooling; Rebecca Leber of The New Republic said that the NASA scientist in question said the opposite of what the Times claimed. In 2015, it published a column by Congressman Lamar Smith in which he argued that the work of the National Oceanic and Atmospheric Administration was "not good science, [but] science fiction."

In 1993, The Washington Times published articles purporting to debunk climate change. It headlined its story about the 1997 Kyoto Protocol on climate change: "Under the deal, the use of coal, oil and other fossil fuel in the United States would be cut by more than one-third by 2002, resulting in lower standards of living for consumers and a long-term reduction in economic growth."

In November 2021, a study by the Center for Countering Digital Hate described The Washington Times as being among "ten fringe publishers" that together were responsible for nearly 70 percent of Facebook user interactions with content that denied climate change. Facebook disputed the study's methodology.

Ozone depletion denial
In the 1990s, The Washington Times published columns which cast doubt on the scientific consensus on the causes of ozone depletion (which had led to an "ozone hole"). It published columns disputing the science as late as 2000. In 1991, NASA scientists warned of the potential of a major Arctic ozone hole developing in the spring of 1992 due to elevated levels of chlorine monoxide in the Arctic stratosphere. However, as the Arctic winter was unusually warm, the chemical reactions needed for ozone depletion did not occur. Even though the science was not incorrect, the Times, along with other conservative media, subsequently created a "crying wolf" narrative, where scientists were portrayed as political activists who were following an environmental agenda rather than the science. In 1992, it published an editorial saying: "This is not the disinterested, objective, just-the-facts tone one ordinarily expects from scientists... This is the cry of the apocalyptic, laying the groundwork for a decidedly non-scientific end: public policy... it would be nice if the next time NASA cries 'wolf,' fewer journalists, politicians and citizens heed the warning like sheep."

Second-hand smoke denial
In 1995, The Washington Times published a column by Fred Singer, who is known for promoting views contrary to mainstream science on a number of issues, where Singer referred to the science on the adverse health impact of second-hand smoke as the "second-hand smoke scare" and accused the Environmental Protection Agency of distorting data when it classified second-hand smoke as harmful. In 1995, it published an editorial titled "How not to spend science dollars" condemning a grant to the National Cancer Institute to study how political contributions from tobacco companies shape policy-making and the voting behavior of politicians.

Controversial reporting on the COVID-19 pandemic
In January 2020, The Washington Times published two widely shared articles about the COVID-19 pandemic that suggested that the virus was created by the government of the People's Republic of China as a biological weapon. One article quoted a former Israeli intelligence officer as a source.

White nationalism, neo-Confederatism, and racism
Under Pruden's editorship (1992–2008), The Washington Times regularly printed excerpts from racist hard-right publications including VDARE and American Renaissance, and from Bill White, leader of the American National Socialist Workers' Party, in its Culture Briefs section.

In 2013, the Columbia Journalism Review reported that under Pruden's editorship The Washington Times was: "a forum for the racialist hard right, including white nationalists, neo-Confederates, and anti-immigrant scare mongers." Between 1998 and 2004, the Times covered every biennial American Renaissance conference, hosted by the white supremacist New Century Foundation. According to the Columbia Journalism Review, "the paper's coverage of these events—which are hotbeds for holocaust deniers, neo-Nazis, and eugenicists—was stunningly one sided", and favorably depicted the conference and attendees. In 2009, journalist David Neiwert wrote that it championed, "various white-nationalist causes emanating from the neo-Confederate movement (with which, until a recent housecleaning, two senior editors had long associations.)"

A page in The Washington Times Sunday edition was devoted to the American Civil War, on which the Confederacy was several times described with admiration. In 1993, Pruden gave an interview to the neo-Confederate magazine Southern Partisan, which has been called "arguably the most important neo-Confederate periodical" by the Southern Poverty Law Center, where he said: "Every year I make sure that we have a story in the paper about any observance of Robert E. Lee's birthday." Pruden said, "And the fact that it falls around Martin Luther King’s birthday," to which a Southern Partisan interviewer interjected, "Makes it all the better," with Pruden finishing, "I make sure we have a story. Oh, yes."

Sam Francis controversy 
The Washington Times employed Sam Francis, a white nationalist, as a columnist and editor, beginning in 1991 after he was chosen by Pat Buchanan to take over his column. In 1995, Francis resigned or was forced out after Dinesh D'Souza reported on racist comments that Francis made at a conference hosted by American Renaissance the previous year. At the conference, Francis called on whites to: "reassert our identity and our solidarity, and we must do so in explicitly racial terms through the articulation of a racial consciousness as whites... The civilization that we as whites created in Europe and America could not have developed apart from the genetic endowments of the creating people."

Francis was an aide to Republican Senator John East of North Carolina before joining the editorial staff of The Washington Times in 1986. Five years later, he became a columnist for the newspaper, and his column became syndicated.

In addition to his journalistic career, Francis was an adjunct scholar at the Ludwig von Mises Institute of Auburn, Alabama.

In June 1995, editor-in-chief Wesley Pruden "had cut back on Francis' column" after The Washington Times ran his essay criticizing the Southern Baptist Convention for its approval of a resolution which apologized for slavery. In the piece, Francis asserted that "The contrition of the Southern Baptists for slavery and racism is a bit more than a politically fashionable gesture intended to massage race relations" and that "Neither slavery' nor racism' as an institution is a sin."

In September 1995, Pruden fired Francis from The Washington Times after conservative journalist Dinesh D'Souza, in a column in The Washington Post, described Francis's appearance at the 1994 American Renaissance conference:

A lively controversialist, Francis began with some largely valid complaints about how the Southern heritage is demonized in mainstream culture. He went on, however, to attack the liberal principles of humanism and universalism for facilitating "the war against the white race." At one point he described country music megastar Garth Brooks as "repulsive" because "he has that stupid universalist song (We Shall Be Free), in which we all intermarry." His fellow whites, he insisted, must "reassert our identity and our solidarity, and we must do so in explicitly racial terms through the articulation of a racial consciousness as whites ... The civilization that we as whites created in Europe and America could not have developed apart from the genetic endowments of the creating people, nor is there any reason to believe that the civilization can be successfully transmitted to a different people."

After D'Souza's column was published, Pruden "decided he did not want the Times associated with such views after looking into other Francis writings, in which he advocated the possible deportation of legal immigrants and forced birth control for welfare mothers."

Francis said soon after the firing that

I believe there are racial differences, there are natural differences between the races. I don't believe that one race is better than another. There's reasonably solid evidence for IQ differences, personality and behavior differences. I understand those things have been taken to justify segregation and white supremacy. That is not my intent.
When Francis died in 2005, The Washington Times wrote a "glowing" obituary that omitted his racist beliefs, as well as his firing from the paper, and described him as a "scholarly, challenging and sometimes pungent writer"; in response, editor David Mastio of the conservative Washington Examiner wrote in an obituary: "Sam Francis was merely a racist and doesn’t deserve to be remembered as anything less." Mastio added that Francis: "led a double life  by day he served up conservative, red meat that was strong but never quite out of bounds by mainstream standards; by night, unbeknownst to the Times or his syndicate, he pushed white supremacist ideas."

Southern Poverty Law Center report 
The Southern Poverty Law Center (SPLC) noted that The Washington Times had, by 2005, published at least 35 articles by Marian Kester Coombs, who was married to managing editor Francis Coombs. She had a record of racially incendiary rhetoric and had written for the white nationalist magazine The Occidental Quarterly,  which has been described as a "stalwart" of the alt-right movement in the United States and as a "far-right, racially obsessed US magazine." The SPLC highlighted columns written by Marian Kester Coombs in The Washington Times, in which she asserted that the whole of human history was "the struggle of ... races"; that non-white immigration is the "importing [of] poverty and revolution" that will end in "the eventual loss of sovereign American territory"; and that Muslims in England "are turning life in this once pleasant land into a misery for its native inhabitants."

Coverage of Barack Obama 

In 2007 The Washington Times companion news magazine Insight on the News (also called just Insight) published a story which claimed that someone on the campaign staff of American presidential candidate Senator Hillary Clinton had leaked a report to one of Insight's reporters which said that  Obama had "spent at least four years in a so-called madrassa, or Muslim seminary, in Indonesia". Insight's editor, Jeff Kuhner, also claimed that the source said that the Clinton campaign was "preparing an accusation that her rival Senator Barack Obama had covered up a brief period he had spent in an Islamic religious school in Indonesia when he was six."  Clinton denied the allegations. When interviewed by the New York Times, Kuhner refused to name the person said to be the reporter's source.

Insight's story was reported on first by conservative talk radio and Fox News Channel, and then by The New York Times and other major newspapers.  CNN reporter John Vause visited State Elementary School Menteng 01, a secular public school which Obama had attended for one year after attending a Roman Catholic school for three, and found that each student received two hours of religious instruction per week in his or her own faith. He was told by Hardi Priyono, deputy headmaster of the school, "This is a public school. We don't focus on religion. In our daily lives, we try to respect religion, but we don't give preferential treatment." Students at Besuki wore Western clothing, and the Chicago Tribune described the school as "so progressive that teachers wore miniskirts and all students were encouraged to celebrate Christmas". Interviews by Nedra Pickler of the Associated Press found that students of all faiths have been welcome there since before Obama's attendance. Akmad Solichin, the vice principal of the school, told Pickler: “The allegations are completely baseless.  Yes, most of our students are Muslim, but there are Christians as well. Everyone's welcome here ... it's a public school.”

In 2008, The Washington Times published a column by Frank Gaffney that promoted the false conspiracy theories which asserted that President Barack Obama was born in Kenya and was courting the "jihadist vote." Gaffney also published pieces in 2009 and 2010 promoting the false assertion that Obama is a Muslim.

In a 2009 column entitled "'Inner Muslim' at work in Cairo", Pruden wrote that President Obama was the: "first president without an instinctive appreciation of the culture, history, tradition, common law and literature whence America sprang. The genetic imprint writ large in his 43 predecessors is missing from the Obama DNA." In another 2009 column, Pruden wrote that Obama had "no natural instinct or blood impulse” for what America was about because he was “sired by a Kenyan father” and “born to a mother attracted to men of the Third World." Pruden's columns stirred controversy, leading The Washington Times to assign David Mastio, its deputy editor, to edit his work.

In 2016, The Washington Times claimed that $3.6 million in federal funds were spent on a 2013 golf outing for President Obama and pro-golfer Tiger Woods which was widely reported on by the American news media in 2013. Snopes rated the article "mostly false", because the estimated cost included both official presidential travel and a brief vacation in Florida. The  online article contained hyperlinks to other, unrelated, stories from The Washington Times. These links' appearance were not readily distinguishable from the citation links sometimes used to support or substantiate reporting. Not included in the article were any links to the Government Accountability Office (GAO) report of expenditure for the 2013 trip, which included a detailed overview of President Obama's activities of 15 February to 18 February 2013.

Ted Nugent controversy

Rock musician Ted Nugent wrote weekly columns for The Washington Times between 2010 and 2012. Prior to joining the Times, Nugent stirred controversy by referring to President Obama as a "piece of shit" and calling on him "to suck on my machine gun", and had also pledged fealty to the Confederate flag. In 2012, Nugent was visited by the Secret Service after he alluded to beheading President Obama. He said that if Obama would win re-election: "I will either be dead or in jail by this time next year." At the time, Mitt Romney's presidential campaign condemned Nugent's remarks; Post media critic Erik Wemple noted that there was no response by The Washington Times. In 2014, Nugent (who had by then departed from the Times) called Obama a "communist-educated, communist-nurtured subhuman mongrel." That February, Nugent had endorsed Greg Abbott in the Republican primary election for Texas Governor. Abbott distanced himself from Nugent saying, "This is not the kind of language I would use or endorse in any way." After being further chastised about it by Senator Rand Paul, Nugent apologized for the comment. Pruden condemned Nugent's remarks, describing Nugent as an "aging rock musician with a loose mouth who was semifamous 40 years ago." David Weigel remarked in Slate: "That long ago? Only a year ago, he filed a special column for the Washington Times. Before that, for a few years, he published a weekly column."

Islamophobia
Gaffney, known for his "long history of pushing extreme anti-Muslim views", wrote weekly columns for The Washington Times from the late 1990s to 2016. According to John Esposito, a Professor of Religion and International Affairs and of Islamic Studies at Georgetown University, Gaffney's "editorial track record in the Washington Times is long on accusation and short on supportive evidence." In columns for the Times, Gaffney helped to popularize conspiracy theories that Islamic terrorists were infiltrating the Bush administration, the conservative movement and the Obama administration. In 2015, the Times published a column describing refugees fleeing the Syrian Civil War as an "Islamic Trojan Horse" conducting a "'jihad' by another name."

The Muslim advocacy group Council on American–Islamic Relations listed The Washington Times among media outlets it said "regularly demonstrates or supports Islamophobic themes." In 1998, the Egyptian newspaper Al-Ahram wrote that its editorial policy was "rabidly anti-Arab, anti-Muslim and pro-Israel."

StaffEditors-in-chiefJames R. Whelan (1982–1984)
Smith Hempstone (1984–1986)
Arnaud de Borchgrave (1986–1992)
Wesley Pruden (1992–2008)
John F. Solomon (2008–2009) (2013–2015)
Sam Dealey (2010)
Ed Kelley (2011–2012)
David S. Jackson (2012–2013)Managing editorsJosette Sheeran Shiner (1992–1997)
Francis Coombs (?–2008)Opinion editorsAnn Crutcher (1984–1985)
William P. Cheshire (1985–1987)
Tony Snow (1987–1990)
Tod Lindberg (1991–1998)
Tony Blankley (2002–2007)
Richard Miniter (2009)
Brett Decker (2009–2013)
Wesley Pruden (2013)
David Keene (2014–2016)
Charles Hurt (2016–present)Current contributorsBill Gertz ("Inside the Ring" columnist)
Rowan Scarborough (national security writer)
Donald Lambro (chief political correspondent)
Jennifer Harper ("Inside the Beltway" columnist)
Joseph Curl (writer and columnist)
Victor Davis Hanson (opinion columnist)
Thom Loverro (sports columnist)
Mark Kellner (religion columnist)
Rita Cook (automobile columnist)
Newt Gingrich (opinion columnist)
Jenny Beth Martin (opinion columnist)
Richard W. Rahn (opinion columnist)
Emmett Tyrrell (opinion columnist)
Clifford D. May (opinion columnist)
Cal Thomas (opinion columnist)
Robert H. Knight (opinion columnist)
Peter Morici (opinion columnist)
Lisa Boothe (opinion columnist)
Tammy Bruce (opinion columnist)
Charles Hurt (opinion editor and columnist)
Jeffrey Birnbaum (columnist)
Stephen Moore (opinion columnist)
Ed Feulner (opinion columnist)
Foster Friess (opinion columnist)
Allen West (opinion columnist)
Everett Piper (opinion columnist)Former contributorsGeorge Archibald (congressional, political, United Nations, and education reporter)
Bruce Bartlett (opinion columnist)
David Brooks (editorial writer, film reviewer)
Amanda Carpenter (columnist)
Ben Carson (opinion columnist)
Monica Crowley (online opinion editor and columnist)
Dave Fay (editor and journalists, deceased)
Bruce Fein (opinion columnist)
Sam Francis (editor and columnist, deceased)
Frank Gaffney (columnist)
Madison Gesiotto (opinion columnist)
Michael Hayden (opinion columnist)
Nat Hentoff (opinion columnist)
Shirley A. Husar (opinion columnist)
Ernest Istook (opinion columnist)
Drew Johnson (columnist)
Tom Knott (sports columnist)
Larry Kudlow (economics columnist)
Jeff Kuhner (opinion columnist)
Willie Lawson (opinion columnist)
Tod Lindberg (opinion columnist)
Herbert London (opinion columnist) (deceased)
Michelle Malkin (columnist)
John McCaslin ("Inside the Beltway" columnist)
Oliver North (opinion columnist)
Ted Nugent (opinion columnist)
Rand Paul (opinion columnist)
Jeremiah O'Leary (deceased)
John Podhoretz (columnist)
Wesley Pruden (editor emeritus and opinion columnist)
Fred Reed (journalist)
Rob Redding (journalist and talk host)
James S. Robbins (opinion columnist)
Bill Sammon (White House correspondent)
Mercedes Schlapp (opinion columnist)
Thomas Sowell (columnist)
Mark Steyn (opinion columnist)
Janine Turner (opinion columnist)
Harlan K. Ullman (opinion columnist)
Diana West (opinion columnist)Others'''
 Daniel Wattenberg: Arts and Entertainment editor
 Julia Duin: Religion editor

 See also 

 Media in Washington, D.C., List of newspapers in Washington, D.C.
 The Washington Star (1852–1981)
 The Washington Post (1877–present)
 Washington Times-Herald, a former D.C. daily newspaper founded by William Randolph Hearst as The Evening Times Washington Times-Herald, a Washington, Indiana newspaper
 New York City Tribune'', sister daily newspaper 1976–1991
 Unification Church political activities

References

External links

 

1982 establishments in Washington, D.C.
Conservative media in the United States
National newspapers published in the United States
Newspapers published in Washington, D.C.
Publications established in 1982
Unification Church affiliated organizations
Podcasting companies
Climate change denial